Marie Zvolánková, née Pavlisová is a Czechoslovak sprint canoeist who competed in the late 1930s.

Together with her sister Marta Pavlisová, she won a gold medal in the K-2 600 m event at the 1938 ICF Canoe Sprint World Championships in Vaxholm.

References

Czechoslovak female canoeists
Possibly living people
20th-century births
Year of birth missing (living people)
ICF Canoe Sprint World Championships medalists in kayak